Rochdale was an ecclesiastical parish of early-medieval origin in northern England, administered from the Church of St Chad, Rochdale. At its zenith, it occupied  of land amongst the South Pennines, and straddled the historic county boundary between Lancashire and the West Riding of Yorkshire. To the north and north-west was the parish of Whalley; to the southwest was the parish of Bury; to the south was Middleton and Prestwich-cum-Oldham.

Anciently a dependency of Whalley Abbey, the parish of Rochdale is believed to be of Anglo-Saxon origin, as evidenced by historical documentation, toponymy and its dedication to Chad of Mercia.

Urbanisation, population shifts, and local government reforms all contributed towards the gradual alteration and ultimate dissolution of the historic parish boundaries; the social welfare functions of the parish were broadly superseded by the English Poor Laws and new units of local governance, such as the County Borough of Rochdale and the Milnrow Urban District. Today, the territory of the former parish lies within Lancashire, Greater Manchester and West Yorkshire.

History
Rochdale was recorded in the Domesday Book as Recedham; and in 1242 as Rachedale.

Divisions
From a very early stage in its history, Rochdale consisted of five divisions or townships: in the Lancashire part of the parish was Butterworth, Castleton (in which stood the parish church), Hundersfield and Spotland; Saddleworth, for ecclesiastical purposes, was a part of Rochdale, but lay entirely in Yorkshire and otherwise had only a "very slight" connection to the parish. Hundersfield was later parted into four townships; Blatchinworth and Calderbrook; Todmorden and Walsden; Wardleworth; and Wuerdle and Wardle, bring the total number of divisions to eight.

See also
Manchester (ancient parish)

References

Notes

Bibliography 

 
 

History of Rochdale
History of Lancashire